Laminacauda plagiata is a species of sheet weaver found in Argentina, Chile and the Falkland Islands. It was described by Tullgren in 1901.

References

Linyphiidae
Spiders of South America
Spiders described in 1901